Alexicles is a monotypic genus of tiger moth genus in the family Erebidae. Its only species, Alexicles aspersa, the Alexicles moth, is found in the US states of New Mexico and Arizona. Both the genus and species were first described by Augustus Radcliffe Grote in 1883.

The wingspan is about 25 mm. Adults are on wing in June and July.

References

Spilosomina
Moths described in 1883
Monotypic moth genera
Moths of North America